Light Square, also known as Wauwi (formerly Wauwe), is one of five public squares in the Adelaide city centre. Located in the centre of the north-western quarter of the Adelaide city centre, its southern boundary is Waymouth Street, while Currie Street crosses its northern tip, isolating about a quarter of its land. Morphett Street runs through the centre in a north–south direction.

It is one of six squares designed by the founder of Adelaide, Colonel William Light, who was Surveyor-General at the time, in his 1837 plan of the City of Adelaide which spanned the River Torrens Valley, comprising the city centre (South Adelaide) and North Adelaide. It was named after the city's founder and planner, Colonel William Light, on 23 May 1837, by the Street Naming Committee. In 2003, it was assigned a second name, Wauwe (later corrected to Wauwi), in the Kaurna language of the original inhabitants, as part of the Adelaide City Council's dual naming initiative. Wauwi was the wife of Kadlitpina, a well-known Kaurna elder.

History 

Light Square was included by Colonel Light on his 1836 survey "Plan of Adelaide". The square was named after Colonel Light by the street naming committee on 23 May 1837.

Unlike the other town squares, which were left as they were for the early part of the 19th century, a grave and monument were added to the square in a nearly central position after the death of Colonel Light on 6 October 1839. The burial took place on 10 October 1839, attended by hundreds, and a gun salute was fired and the flag at Government House lowered to half-mast.

The foundation stone for the first memorial was laid by James Hurtle Fisher in 1843, but the edifice itself, designed by George Strickland Kingston, was not completed until February 1845.

In 1880, Light Square was surrounded by a palisade fence of cast iron, with six gates, each of which opened onto paths laid throughout the Square, which were lit at night.

By 1892 the first memorial on Light's grave had been badly eroded by the weather, but initial attempts by then mayor of Adelaide, Frederick William Bullock, did not meet with success. A second committee, formed in 1904, decided to create a new monument in Light Square and also a separate statue in Victoria Square (later moved to Montefiore Hill in 1938). The crumbling old grave monument was replaced by the winning design in a competition, by architect Herbert Louis Jackman. and was unveiled in June 1905 by mayor of Adelaide Theodore Bruce after an address by Deputy Governor Sir Samuel Way, and still stands today.

Tram tracks were laid in 1908, and in 1910 Currie Street was extended to cut through the Square. In the 1920s, a redesign was effected, with the removal of the iron fence, new kerbing added and extensive removal of trees that were either dying or considered unsuitable. The designers maintained the Gardenesque style of planting, retaining a variety of tree species, which included pepper trees, olive trees, Moreton Bay figs, and river sheoak trees.

Landscape renovations were done in the 1980s, including the replacement of old trees with new ones and another rerouting the pathways. A bronze plaque acknowledging the redesign was unveiled in the Square on 19 October 1986. Other statues and sculptures were also placed in the Square (see below).

21st century

In 2003 Light Square was given the name Wauwe as part of the Kaurna Naming Project. Wauwe, meaning female grey kangaroo, was named after the wife of Kadlitpinna, or "Captain Jack", one of the three Kaurna Burkas, or elders, at the time of colonisation. Kadlitpinna was appointed as an honourable constable; he was issued with a baton and uniform and attended official meetings with the Governor of South Australia. In February 2013 the spelling was revised to Wauwi.

Description
The Square is divided into a number of sections separated by roads. Waymouth Street (runs east–west) forms the southern boundary of the Square. Currie Street (east-west) divides the southern two-thirds of the square from the northern third. Morphett Street (north-south) is interrupted by the square one town acre south of Hindley Street, and recommences from the south side of Waymouth Street.

Light's grave monument, situated centrally, features a bronze tripod  and theodolite, atop a tall column made of red granite sourced from the Murray Bridge area, with a base of Monarto grey granite.

There is a bronze statue of Catherine Helen Spence in the southwest corner. The life-size bronze statue was designed by Ieva Pocius and erected for the 150th anniversary of European settlement in South Australia, unveiled by Queen Elizabeth II on 10 March 1986. The statue depicts Spence holding an open book on top of a three-tiered triangular pedestal, with the inscription underneath: "Catherine Helen Spence, 1825-1910, social and political reformer, writer and preacher who worked for children". It

In 2003, two sculptures were moved to the Square. The Knot (or just Knot), made in 1975  by well-known Adelaide artist Bert Flugelman (who also created the "mall's balls" (Spheres) in Rundle Mall), was originally commissioned for the Art Gallery of South Australia, where it remained from 1975 to 1995. Owing to redevelopment at the gallery, it was relocated to the middle of the northern third of the square in 2003.

In the same year, a sculpture named The Eternal Question, originally designed by Richard Tipping for the Adelaide Festival of Arts in 1982, was relocated to Light Square. Consisting of black granite blocks, they were destined to be used as a breakwater before they were saved by Ron Radford, the director of AGSA, in 1983. After a period on loan to the Adelaide City Council, they were moved to the Square.

Social history

The western side of the city was originally a largely residential area, created by the rapid construction of small houses built to accommodate new arrivals to the Colony. As the population increased, the lots were subdivided further, making them more affordable. This drew working class and unemployed people, as well as temporary residents, prostitutes and other "undesirable" elements to the area. By the 1880s the living conditions were bad, with factories, workshops and warehouses being built among the houses. With a rapidly increasing population between 1870 and 1890, the area became overcrowded and the existing infrastructure inadequate, with poor sewage, an unsafe water supply and no footpaths. These conditions in the area, and the bordering Shamrock Hotel (now Colonel Light Hotel) being notorious for violence, prostitution and drinking, caused the west end to gain a bad reputation among respectable society in Adelaide.

Those Aboriginal people  who remained in Adelaide also lived in the area around Light Square, with an increase in numbers in the early twentieth century due partly to the policy of assimilation. Many Aboriginal people returned to the city from missions such as Point Pearce and Point McLeay, and others migrated from elsewhere, looking for better employment opportunities, education and housing. These groups included Kaurna people as well as others from the neighbouring Narungga and Ngarrindjeri peoples. The Aboriginal people created their own social life and places, and Light Square served as a community meeting place. Being close to the western park lands, where many others camped, the Square became the main meeting area for this community from 1900 until the 1960s, when Victoria Square/Tarntanyangga became more popular as an area to congregate.

West End rejuvenation
Since the rejuvenation of the "West End" of Adelaide, beginning with the construction of the City West campus of the University of South Australia on North Terrace in the 1990s, Light Square has played host to many events, including Adelaide Fringe events and music and other festivals. The AC Arts Centre, a venue for the Adelaide Festival and many other events, is at 39 Light Square, and the Lion Arts Centre, JamFactory and other arts-related institutions are close by. The  location of the West End campus has meant more student housing and night life in the area, and it is no longer considered a downmarket area.

Since May 2019, the APY Art Centre Collective, a gallery and studio space for the work of artists from a collective of ten artist centres across the APY lands and Northern Territory, has been housed at no. 9.

See also
Hindmarsh Square/Mukata
Hurtle Square/Tangkaira
Victoria Square/Tarntanyangga
Whitmore Square/Iparrityi
William Light

Footnotes

References

Squares in Adelaide
Parks in Adelaide